The Asian Rugby Series was an international rugby union competition held between Asian national rugby sides. The tournament started in 2003, initially as an alternative to the ARFU Asian Rugby Championship, but was merged with the ARC in 2008, to create the Asian Five Nations.

Hall of Fame 

 
Rugby union competitions in Asia for national teams
Recurring sporting events established in 2003
Defunct rugby union competitions for national teams
2003 establishments in Asia